State Highway 240 (SH 240) is a Texas state highway that runs from Harrold east to Burkburnett, then south parallel to Interstate 44 to Wichita Falls.

Route description
SH 240 begins at an intersection with  US 287 south of Harrold in eastern Wilbarger County. The route travels eastward and soon crosses into Wichita County, intersecting  SH 25 in Haynesville. The highway enters the city of Burkburnett along 3rd Street before turning to the south and crossing the  I-44 freeway. SH 240 then roughly parallels the freeway, and passes Sheppard AFB as it enters Wichita Falls city limits along Burkburnett Road. SH 240 parallels the Wichita, Tillman and Jackson Railway line as it travels through the city center before the route ends at  Bus. US 287 on the east side of the city.

History
SH 240 was originally designated on December 22, 1936, from Harrold to Burkburnett. It was extended south to Wichita Falls on April 24, 1964, over the former route of  US 277 / US 281 / US 287 when the new route was opened.

Major intersections

References

240
Transportation in Wilbarger County, Texas
Transportation in Wichita County, Texas